Log is a rural locality (a village) in Nikolskoye Rural Settlement, Kaduysky District, Vologda Oblast, Russia. The population was 11 as of 2002.

Geography 
Log is located 43 km north of Kaduy (the district's administrative centre) by road. Seninskaya is the nearest rural locality.

References 

Rural localities in Kaduysky District